Saint Demetrios Greek Orthodox Church is a church in Hammond, Indiana.  It is part of the Greek Orthodox Metropolis of Chicago, within the Greek Orthodox Archdiocese of America.

Notes

External links 
 Saint Demetrios Greek Orthodox Church, official site

Churches in Lake County, Indiana
Religious organizations based in the United States
Greek Orthodox churches in the United States